The Texas House of Representatives 50th District represents a northeast portion of Austin and a small part of southern Pflugerville, both in Travis County. The current Representative is Celia Israel, who will not seek re-election in 2022.

The current Representative for Texas State House district 52, James Talarico, has announced he will run for the Democratic nomination for this seat in 2022.

References 

50